Dissodinium is a genus of dinoflagellates belonging to the order Gymnodiniales, family unknown.

Species

Species:

Dissodinium bicorne 
Dissodinium bocornis 
Dissodinium elegans

References

Gymnodiniales
Dinoflagellate genera